The discography of Jason Mraz, an American singer, consists of seven studio albums, five live albums, two compilation albums, one video album, fourteen extended plays, twenty-eight singles (including six as a featured artist), eight promotional singles and thirteen music videos. After various independent releases, Mraz signed to Elektra Records and released his debut studio album, Waiting for My Rocket to Come, in October 2002. The album peaked at number 55 on the US Billboard 200 and was certified platinum by the Recording Industry Association of America (RIAA). "The Remedy (I Won't Worry)", the album's first single, peaked at number 15 on the Billboard Hot 100. Waiting for My Rocket to Come also spawned the singles "You and I Both" and "Curbside Prophet". In 2005, Mraz signed a new contract with Atlantic Records; he released his second studio album, Mr. A–Z, in July. The album was a commercial success, peaking at number five on the Billboard 200. Mr. A–Z spawned the singles "Wordplay", "Did You Get My Message?" and "Geek in the Pink".

In May 2008, Mraz released his third studio album, We Sing. We Dance. We Steal Things. The album debuted and peaked at number three on the Billboard 200 and was a commercial success worldwide. Mraz's international breakthrough came with the release of the album's lead single, "I'm Yours". It peaked at number six on the Billboard Hot 100, giving Mraz his first top ten single on the chart. "I'm Yours" stayed on the Hot 100 for 76 weeks, setting the record for the most total weeks on the chart. The single topped the charts in countries such as New Zealand and hit the ten in multiple other countries. We Sing. We Dance. We Steal Things. also spawned the singles "Make It Mine" and "Lucky", both of which achieved moderate commercial success. Mraz's fourth studio album, Love Is a Four Letter Word, was released in April 2012; it peaked at number two on the Billboard 200. The album was preceded by the release of its lead single "I Won't Give Up", which peaked at number eight on the Billboard Hot 100 and became an international hit.

Mraz's fifth studio album, Yes!, was released in July 2014; it peaked at number two on the Billboard 200 and consisted of the band Raining Jane as his backing band. His sixth studio album, Know., was released in August 2018 and featured Raining Jane as well.

On February 11, 2022, Mraz released his second compilation album Lalalalovesongs, which features a bonus track "Always Looking for You".

Albums

Studio albums

Live albums

Compilation albums

Video albums

Extended plays

Singles

As lead artist

As featured artist

Promotional singles

Other charted songs

Other appearances

Music videos

As lead artist

As featured artist

Notes

References

External links
 Official website
 Jason Mraz at AllMusic
 
 

Discographies of American artists
Pop music discographies
Rock music discographies
Discography